George Frederico Torres Homem Chaia (born February 3, 1991 in Rio de Janeiro), commonly known as "Gegê" Chaia, is a Brazilian professional basketball player, who currently plays as point guard for Corinthians in the Novo Basquete Brasil (NBB).

Professional career
Chaia started his career at Tijuca, but then moved to Spanish club Baloncesto Torrejón in 2008, where he became a professional player. In 2010, he transferred to Flamengo, on a one-season loan spell. In that season he won the Brazilian Developmental League youth age championship.

Tijuca Tênis Clube
For the 2011–12 NBB season, Chaia signed with his former club, Tijuca Tênis Clube and debuted in the NBB. He didn't have any impressive numbers, but managed to play in four postseason games.

Flamengo
In 2012, Chaia once again signed with Flamengo. This time with more experience, he became the team's back-up point guard, and with them he won the 2012–13 season championship of the Brazilian NBB league. In the next season, 2013–14, Chaia got even more playing time, and was more consistently in the team's rotation. In that season, he averaged 6.2 points and 5.4 assists per game in the Brazilian NBB's regular season. That season, he also won the 2014 FIBA Americas League and the 2013–14 season championship of the Brazilian NBB league.

His most important career achievement came at the beginning of the 2014–15 season, when his team, Flamengo, defeated Maccabi Tel Aviv, on aggregate score, in a two-game series, to become the 2014 FIBA Intercontinental Cup champions.

NBB statistics

NBB regular season

NBB playoffs

References

External links
Twitter Account
NBB Player Profile 
LatinBasket.com Profile

1991 births
Living people
Associação Bauru Basketball players
Brazilian men's basketball players
Flamengo basketball players
Minas Tênis Clube basketball players
Novo Basquete Brasil players
Point guards
Basketball players from Rio de Janeiro (city)
Tijuca Tênis Clube basketball players